The Brain Mapping Foundation is a neuroscience organization established in 2004 by Babak Kateb to advance cross-pollination of ideas across physical sciences into biological sciences and neuroscience. The organization provides funding to the members of the Society for Brain Mapping and Therapeutics (SBMT). One of the focuses of the foundation is to further establish and fund the National Center for NanoBioElectronics (NCNBE) to rapidly integrate nanotechnology, devices, imaging, cellular and stem cell therapy. The organization has played a significant role in President Obama's BRAIN initiative.

Definition of brain mapping
The study of the anatomy and function of the brain and spinal cord through the use of imaging (including intra-operative, Microscopic, Endoscopic and Multi-Modality imaging), Immunohistochemistry, Molecular & optogenetics, Stem cell and Cellular Biology, Engineering (material, electrical and biomedical), Neurophysiology and Nanotechnology (See Brain Mapping for more information).

Special projects
Currently the organization is focused on establishing Global Alliance for Nano-Bio-Electronics through its National Center for NanoBioElectronic and has shaped policies in the field of Nanoneuroscience and Nanoneurosurgery.  In this regard, the foundation has established significant ties with international partners and plans to launch a global consortium in Neuroscience with a specific aim of integrating nanotechnology, device, imaging and cellular therapy. BMF has signed a formal consortium agreement with Dr. Charlie Teo's Cure Brain Cancer Foundation in Australia, which is focused on eradicating brain cancers. NCNBE has also launched a graduate training program in NanoBioElectronic, which will be offering a doctoral degree in NanoBioElectronics.

Publications
BMF has been a major supporter of the Society for Brain Mapping and Therapeutics (SBMT) annual meetings and its publications. The Foundation supported series of special issue publications with NeuroImage, in which members of the Society published their findings. The articles these publications were discontinued when the Society went into partnership with PLOS ONE on the ″NeuroMapping & Therapeutics Collection″. BMF also played a major role in publishing the first Textbook of Nanoneuroscience and Nanoneurosurgery.

Funded projects
The foundation funds multidisciplinary translation research such as:
 Galaxy-Exploring Camera to Be Used in the Operating Room 
 JPL Nanotubes Help Advance Brain Tumor Research
 NASA's Electronic Nose May Provide Neurosurgeons with A New Weapon Against Brain Cancer 
 X Marks the Spot; Infrared Technology used for intraoperative Mapping of the Human Brain Tumors
The Brain Mapping Foundation has been supporting annual meetings of Society for Brain Mapping and Therapeutics in the last 10 years.

Brain Mapping Day at the US Congress
Brain Mapping Foundation in collaboration with the Society for Brain Mapping and Therapeutics (SBMT), hold the Brain Mapping Days at the US Congress and Canadian Parliament to educate policymakers about the state-of-the-art research in neuroscience.  More information about the Brain Mapping Days can be found at https://web.archive.org/web/20131022180145/http://www.worldbrainmapping.org/brain-mapping-day and http://www.worldbrainmapping.org/brain-research-day.

Several notable scientists, such as Dr. Keith L. Black and Jean Paul Allain, have briefed congressional leaders during the Brain Mapping Days organized by BMF and SMBT.

Awards
Brain Mapping Foundation has partnered with Society for Brain Mapping and Therapeutics (SBMT) to identify the most important scientific and clinical contributions to the field, and recognize them with the prestigious “Pioneer” awards.  The awards are presented in partnership with SBMT, industry leaders and other foundations to highlight the significant work done by scientists, industry leaders, individuals, and policymakers.

U.S. congresswoman Gabby Giffords is the only award recipient who has been recognized twice by the Society and the Foundation for her courage and dedication toward raising awareness for neurotrauma as well as her role in healthcare reform. She was awarded a Beacon of courage and dedication and Pioneer in healthcare policy award by the Foundation and the Society.

Global Physicians and Scientists (GPS)
GPS is a humanitarian program, which is focused on mobilizing physicians, scientists and surgeons to serve for few weeks in the poor and rural areas of the United States and abroad. This program collaborates with industry and government officials and uses the national and international SBMT centers as bases of operations. The program is designed to help alleviate healthcare disparities by bringing world class physicians to poor areas, and to help improve local economies through micro and neuro economics.

References

External links
 Official Website

Neuroscience organizations